Escher Wyss may refer to:

 Escher Wyss & Cie., a former Swiss engineering company
 Escher Wyss (Zürich), a quarter of the Swiss city of Zürich